This is a List of Japanese musical groups that debuted in the 2020s.

See also the list of groups that debuted in the 1990s, 2000s, and 2010s.

2020

 All at Once
 Arcana Project
 Beatcats
 Chō Tokimeki Sendenbu
 Go to the Beds
 JO1
 Nemophila
 NiziU
 Orbit
 Paradises
 Piggs
 Sakurazaka46
 SixTones
 Snow Man
 Zamb

2021
≠Me
ASP
Be First
Ho6la
INI
Naniwa Danshi

2022
ExWhyZ
Metamuse
Ocha Norma
Travis Japan
XG

2023
MiSaMo

See also
 List of Japanese musical groups (2010s)

 
2020s in Japanese music